Octomeles is a monotypic genus of plant in family Tetramelaceae. The sole species is Octomeles sumatrana, sometimes written O. sumatranum.

Octomeles sumatrana, commonly called Benuang, or Ilimo, is found in Brunei, Indonesia, Malaysia, Papua New Guinea, the Philippines, and the Solomon Islands. It and Tetrameles nudiflora are the only two species in the family Tetramelaceae. They were previously classified in the Datiscaceae but found genetically to not form a natural clade with the other members of that family.

A pioneer species, it regenerates quickly in disturbed habitats such as logged forest and previously cultivated land. Also, like other pioneer species, it is relatively short lived; even the emergent titans rarely exceeding 85 years of age.

References

Tetramelaceae
Monotypic Cucurbitales genera
Flora of Malesia
Flora of Borneo
Trees of Brunei
Trees of New Guinea
Trees of Papuasia
Trees of Sulawesi
Trees of Sumatra
Trees of the Philippines
Taxonomy articles created by Polbot
Dioecious plants